is a Japanese football player. She plays for JEF United Chiba. She played for Japan national team.

Club career
Yamazaki was born in Saitama Prefecture on June 9, 1990. When she was high school student, she played for her local club AS Elfen Sayama FC. After graduating from high school, she joined Albirex Niigata in 2009. In June 2016, she moved to AC Nagano Parceiro. In 2018, she moved to JEF United Chiba.

National team career
In March 2013, Yamazaki was selected Japan national team for 2013 Algarve Cup. At this competition, on March 6, she debuted against Norway. She played 4 games for Japan in 2013.

National team statistics

References

External links

JEF United Chiba

1990 births
Living people
Niigata University of Health and Welfare alumni
Association football people from Saitama Prefecture
Japanese women's footballers
Japan women's international footballers
Nadeshiko League players
Chifure AS Elfen Saitama players
Albirex Niigata Ladies players
AC Nagano Parceiro Ladies players
JEF United Chiba Ladies players
Women's association football midfielders